Samuel Wilmot may refer to:

 Samuel Wilmot (1772–1848), Irish surgeon
 Samuel Street Wilmot (1773–1856), Canadian surveyor